The 10 Under 10 Film Festival was created by independent documentary filmmaker and University of Texas at Austin Associate Professor, Ellen Spiro.  The intention of the film festival is to encourage raw creativity among new filmmakers without relying on huge budgets.

Since 2002, the film festival has showcased short, high-quality, low-budget documentaries "founded on the notion that great ideas can happen on no budget and in little time". As a film professor, Spiro says that she has watched too many students get caught in the romance of film school debt and challenges filmmakers to make films with "little money but lots of substance and inventiveness".

The name expresses the informal desire to show ten films, each less than ten minutes long, costing less than $10 to make.

See also
168 Hour Film Project

References

External links 
  10 Under 10 Film Festival Official Website

Further reading 
  "Shorts on a Shoestring:  The Texas Documentary Tour Presents 10 Under 10."  The Austin Chronicle.  2005-5-6.  Retrieved on 2007-7-11.
   "Capturing K-Town"   The Texas Observer.  2005-7-8.  Retrieved on 2007-7-11.
  "Ten Little Indies: UT and AFS Team up for a Doc Tour Deviation: 10 films Under 10 Minutes Long Made for Less Than $10."  The Austin Chronicle.  2004-5-7.  Retrieved on 2007-7-11.
  "Through a Student's Lens, Quirkily Texas Documentary Tour presents '10 under 10'".  The Austin Chronicle.  2003-5-9.  Retrieved on 2007-7-11.

Organizations with a similar mission 

 All American High School Film Festival
 Student World Impact Film Festival
 The Lighthouse Initiative - Filmmaking for Students

Film festivals in Austin, Texas
Short film festivals in the United States
Documentary film festivals in the United States
Film festivals established in 2002
Student film festivals
2002 establishments in Texas